Belber is a heritage American leather goods company founded in Philadelphia in 1891.

History

Foundation

The Belber company was established in 1891 when two school-age brothers, Aaron and Henry Belber, scraped together $200 and started making luggage in a South Philadelphia basement. The Belber brothers, ages 14 and 17, worked 10 hours a day, six days a week, hand-stitching luggage.

History

The Belber brothers opened a first factory in 1903.

The Belber brothers were soon joined by their 2 other brothers, Herman and Maurice.

In 1919, the Belber Trunk and Bag Company acquired the Oshkosh Trunk Company and became one of the world's biggest manufacturers of traveling goods.

In 1920, the company purchased the Larkin Building on Arch Street in Philadelphia to house its main office, a factory and a salesroom. In addition, Belber built a national network of production, distribution and direct sales which by 1926 included manufacturing plants at Woodbury and Newark, New Jersey, and Oshkosh, Wisconsin, as well as branch warehouses and offices in Pittsburgh, New York, Minneapolis, Chicago and San Francisco.

The Belber Trunk and Bag Company continued its expansion by acquiring the Schmit Bros. Trunk Company (which included the Eagle Trunk Company) in 1926 and the trunkmakers Innovation and Neverbreak in the 1930s.

In 1930, Belber moved its headquarters to Woodbury, New Jersey, into a building that used to house the Blasius piano factory.

In 1947, Belber closed its plant in Philadelphia and transferred all its activities to Woodbury, New Jersey.

In the 1950s, Belber starts to lose momentum with the development of air travel and eventually went dormant in the middle of the 1970s.

In 2013, a group of entrepreneurs acquires Belber from with plans to revive the brand.

In early 2016, a new collection of bags and accessories is launched.

Products

In the roaring twenties, Belber's trunks, suitcases, and collapsible silk cord hangers were symbols of luxury travel.
  
The Belber brothers were determined to revolutionize the idea of the journey, developing a “luggage consciousness” to influence customers that the bag was just as important as what went inside it. People began to want to look good when they traveled, and only the extremely wealthy could afford to do so during this period. However, with the production of Belber goods, the concept of "traveling in style" was made accessible to ordinary consumers.

Innovations and patents

Between 1907 and 1935, Belber registered up to 80 patents in the US for various technical product innovations.

Some of the exclusive and patented Belber devices included the "Belber Safe Lock" enabling an easy opening and closing of the trunk, the "Belber Curtain Follower" (attached to the back of the trunk and holding firmly in place the garments by a rod inserted into a graduated ratchet), and multiple Drawer Locking Devices.

Belber advertised in nationally circulated magazines, touting its luggage as "as modern as tomorrow."

Advertising

The Belber brothers were all about showing America that a bag was all about personality and they did this by spreading the word through illustrated magazine and newspaper ads. Early precursors to the advertising heyday of Madison Avenue, the Belber advertisements were just as much about the American dream of social mobility as they were about how to live and dress well.
 
Belber ads were written to be inspirational and aspirational. “With vision and expectancy, your travel plans are born. Matched with magnificence, superbly designed Belber canvas and leather bound luggage gives stately expression to your travel luxury,” reads one for Belber’s luggage ads. “Your trunk is brought to your room. You unlock it. Swing it open. There, all your clothes fresh and dainty as when you put them in. Everything in its place, nothing missed. No unpacking to do, no trouble at all. You are at home and settled at once,” promises another from the 1920s. 
 
In the 1940s, to advertise its new collections, the Belber brothers also helped invent the concept of product tie-ins and product placement, partnering with Hollywood Stars such as Ray Milland in the movie The Big Clock (film) and Alan Ladd in the movie Saigon (1948 film).

The Belber Building

Belber occupied the Larkin-Belber Building from 1920 to 1947. It was a large industrial facility with 4,430,000 cubic feet and 295,360 square feet of floor space on twelve floors located at 22nd St and Arch St in Philadelphia. Belber operated a showroom and a store on the first floor of the building while the rail spur off the Schuylkill Expressway linked the firm to its national market.

The firm hired local architect Leroy Berman Rothschild to place Belber's own stamp on the building. Rothshild designed large rooftop signs placed along the sides of the building.  In its architecture as well as its integration of manufacturing, office work, and retail functions, the Belber Building represented a "landmark of twentieth century commerce and industry."

See also
Goyard
Louis Vuitton
Moynat
Hartmann
Mark Cross

References

External links
Official Brand Website
 Video on the history of Belber 

Luggage manufacturers
Leather goods
Luggage brands
American brands
Fashion accessory companies
Luxury brands
Manufacturing companies based in Pennsylvania
Manufacturing companies established in 1891
Bags (fashion)
2010s fashion
1891 establishments in Pennsylvania